The Church of San Torcuato (Spanish: Iglesia Parroquial de San Torcuato) is a church located in Santorcaz, Spain. It was declared Bien de Interés Cultural in 1997.

Torcuato
Bien de Interés Cultural landmarks in the Community of Madrid